East Riding of Yorkshire Council is the local authority of the East Riding of Yorkshire. It is a unitary authority, having the powers of a non-metropolitan county and district council combined. It provides a full range of local government services including Council Tax billing, libraries, social services, processing planning applications, waste collection and disposal, and it is a local education authority.

Powers and functions
The local authority derives its powers and functions from the Local Government Act 1972 and subsequent legislation. For the purposes of local government, the East Riding of Yorkshire is within a non-metropolitan area of England. As a unitary authority, East Riding of Yorkshire Council has the powers and functions of both a non-metropolitan county and district council combined. In its capacity as a district council it is a billing authority collecting Council Tax and business rates; it processes local planning applications; and it is responsible for housing, waste collection and environmental health. In its capacity as a county council it is a local education authority, responsible for social services, libraries and waste disposal.

Politics

Elections to the authority are held every four years, with all of the 67 seats, representing 26 wards, on the council being filled. It was under no overall control from 1995 to 2007; the Conservative Party regained a majority at the 2007 election, which it then increased in 2011. The composition of the council after the latest election on 2 May 2019, and subsequent by-elections, and defections is as follows:

Structure
The council consists of 67 councillors who are elected every four years from 26 wards, each ward returning up to three councillors. The council was led by Steven Parnaby of the Conservative Party from its creation until his retirement at the 2019 election, when Richard Burton was elected as his replacement. On 13 May 2021, Jonathan Owen was elected as the new leader of the council. John Whittle is the chairman of the authority.

References

External links 
 

Unitary authority councils of England
Local education authorities in England
Local authorities in the East Riding of Yorkshire
Leader and cabinet executives
Billing authorities in England